Star Awards 2004 was a television award telecasted in 2004 as part of the annual Star Awards organised by MediaCorp for MediaCorp TV Channel 8. This award was the 11th installment since its first presentation in 1994, ten years ago. This award ceremony saw revamps to various category awards, such as the introduction to the All-Time Favourite Artiste (an award for artistes who held ten Top 10 Most Popular Artistes Awards, recipients will not be eligible for future Top 10 Most Popular Artistes Awards), popularity polls held in Taiwan and Malaysia were discontinued and the retirement of the Special Achievement Award.

The ceremony was held on 12 December 2004 at the MediaCorp TV Theater with Timothy Chao and Taiwanese hostess Matilda Tao hosting.

Winners and nominees
Winners are listed first, highlighted in boldface.

Special Awards 
Replacing the Special Achievement Award is All-Time Favourite Artiste- this award is a special achievement award given out to artiste(s) who have achieved a maximum of 10 popularity awards over 10 years. These artistes who won the All-Time Favourite Artiste were no longer eligible from running for the Top 10 Most Favourite Artiste in future ceremonies onwards, and its system is implemented so as to let younger MediaCorp artistes have a chance to win the popularity awards as well. Note that all three artistes' Top 10 winning years the recipients were awarded together on the same year.

Popularity Awards

Ceremony 
Professional and Technical Awards were presented before the main ceremony via a clip montage due to time constraints. The main awards were presented during the ceremony.

Performers and Presenters
The following individuals presented awards or performed musical numbers.

Backstage

Main Ceremony

Awards

External links
Star Awards Hall of Fame

Star Awards